Eli Stone is an American legal musical comedy-drama television series that was created by Greg Berlanti and Marc Guggenheim, who also served as executive producers alongside Ken Olin who directed the pilot, with Melissa Berman producing. The series originally aired on ABC from January 31, 2008 to July 11, 2009, for two seasons.

The series follows Stone (Jonny Lee Miller), a San Francisco lawyer who begins to have hallucinations (such as a George Michael soundtrack that only he can hear and getting dive-bombed by a World War I biplane on a busy San Francisco street) which leads him to two possible conclusions: a potentially fatal brain aneurysm, or the chance that something greater is at work. His visions lead him to accept cases with little monetary gain but a lot of moral goodness; Stone also predicts an earthquake that hits San Francisco. Other such events occur throughout the course of the series, but the series was cancelled before reaching a coherent conclusion.

The series has been met with generally favorable reviews from critics, and both seasons have been released on DVD.

Premise
Greg Berlanti, who co-wrote the show with Marc Guggenheim, described Eli Stone in Variety as "a Field of Dreams-type drama set in a law firm where a thirty-something attorney, whose name is the title of the show, begins having larger-than-life visions that compel him to do out-of-the-ordinary things". Eli suffers from an inoperable brain aneurysm that causes him to have realistic hallucinations often relating to the plot of the episode to the extent that he may be considered a modern-day prophet.

Pop singer George Michael was featured prominently throughout the first season of the series, and each episode was named after one of his songs. Berlanti is a fan of Michael and made an effort to have him appear on the show. As luck would have it, Michael claimed he was a "TV junkie". This led to the singer agreeing to do several episodes, including one in which Stone represents him in the case of a teen girl who plays the song "I Want Your Sex" in protest of an abstinence-only sex education program in her school.

The show's legal setting, mixture of comedy and drama, and use of fantasy sequences has drawn comparisons to the series Ally McBeal from some critics.

Production
Produced by Berlanti Television, After Portsmouth, and ABC Studios, the series was officially greenlit and given a thirteen-episode order on May 11, 2007, and it aired as a mid-season replacement in 2008.
Eli Stone premiered on Thursday, January 31, 2008 at 10:00 Eastern/9:00 Central, following the return of Lost; its first-season finale aired April 17, 2008.

On May 13, 2008, ABC officially announced that the show had been renewed for the 2008–09 season.  Moreover, in Canada, CTVglobemedia announced that they would send down the series to CTV's relaunched "A" television system for the 2008–2009 season. Season 2 premiered on Tuesday, October 14 at 10:00 Eastern/9:00 Central.

On November 20, 2008, however, ABC told the show's producers that it had opted not to order any new episodes, signaling that the series would be cancelled once all the episodes were aired.

The last scheduled episode of Eli Stone aired on December 30, 2008. The final four episodes of the series aired on Saturdays at 10:00 Eastern/9:00 Central on ABC starting Saturday, June 20, 2009. The final episode, "Flight Path", aired on July 11, 2009.

The unaired episodes, starting with "Sonoma", were broadcast in Ireland by RTÉ starting on March 13, 2009. The British Sci-Fi channel aired the final four episodes starting on March 16, 2009. The episode aired in Israel's Yes Stars Drama/HD channel and German TV channel Pro7 starting on March 31, 2009. Finally, in Australia, the Seven Network aired the final four episodes in the month of April, on Tuesdays at 22:30.

Cast and characters

Main
 Jonny Lee Miller as Eli Stone, a successful attorney in San Francisco who is diagnosed with an inoperable brain aneurysm which is causing hallucinations. The hallucinations cause Eli to become alienated from his peers and soon his life takes a detour. Despite the fact that he is not religious, he interprets his hallucinations as signs, helping people in accepting lawsuits in hopes of bettering their lives.
 Young Eli is played by Justin Lieberman.
 Natasha Henstridge as Taylor Wethersby, Eli's ex-fiancee who is also an attorney. She formerly worked in another company, and later joins Eli's firm after they broke up. Although taken aback by Eli's episodes of hallucinations, she is determined to help him by any means. She is the daughter of Jordan Wethersby, the head of Wethersby, Posner & Klein.
 Loretta Devine as Patti Dellacroix, Eli's helpful and bossy assistant. She considers Eli as a dear friend of hers and she is always blatantly honest to Eli.
 Matt Letscher as Dr. Nathan Stone, Eli's caring, elder brother who is a doctor. He is the one who first discovered Eli's conditions and is skeptical about his visions. Nathan dated Beth, a girl who Eli lost his virginity to in college, after Eli introduced both of them to each other at his engagement party.
 Sam Jaeger as Matt Dowd, Eli's co-worker and rival in the law firm. He is described as sarcastic, arrogant and having a frat-boy personality. He is dating Taylor Wethersby and they are going to have a baby.
 James Saito as Dr. Chen, an acupuncturist who explains Eli's conditions as a prophetic message. He helps Eli to analyze the visions Eli has and advises Eli to pursue them. He studied acupuncture in Beijing as well as holistic medicine. It is revealed that he is not a Chinese immigrant, and the "Dr. Chen" is merely an act so he will be taken seriously, because "No one trusts an acupuncturist from New Jersey". He once worked for Eli's father, who told him once that he would repay a favor by helping his son (Eli) someday.
 Julie Gonzalo as Maggie Dekker, a junior attorney who is ambitious and enthusiastic to her work. Much to Eli's dismay, she often assists him in his cases in hopes of moving up the career ladder. She is considered a religious person and is the first person to believe in Eli's visions without hesitations. She was engaged to Scott, who is in Eli's visions of the earthquake.
 Jason Winston George as Keith Bennett, a criminal law attorney who sued a potential employer for racism. After Keith lost the lawsuit, Jordan hired him as he saw Keith's potential.
 Victor Garber as Jordan Wethersby, the co-owner of the firm and Taylor's father. He is often skeptical of Eli's imaginings. However, he is a mentor and father figure to Eli, and represented Eli when Eli was brought before the bar for allegedly being unable to represent clients' interests while suffering visions.

Recurring
 Laura Benanti as Beth "Lizzie" Keller, the girl to whom Eli lost his virginity back in college who now has an autistic son. She dated Nathan. (Seasons 1 and 2)
 Tom Amandes as Martin Posner, one of the co-owners of the firm. He had a relationship with Patti in the past. (Seasons 1 and 2)
 Katey Sagal as Marci Klein, one of the co-owners of the firm. She is unfriendly, being primarily interested in the financial benefits that accrue to the firm. She dislikes Eli's intention to help more individuals than major corporations. (Seasons 1 and 2)
 Pamela Reed as Mrs. Stone. (Season 1 only)
 Tom Cavanagh as Jeremy Stone, the late father of Nathan and Eli. He also had a brain aneurysm which causes hallucinations. He suffered from depression and was an alcoholic, which causes Nathan and Eli to resent him. He died from a heart attack 10 years ago. (Flashbacks in seasons 1 and 2)
 George Michael as himself. (Season 1 only)
 Bridget Moynahan as Ashley Cardiff, Eli's ex-girlfriend.
 Taraji P. Henson as Angela Scott, Patti's daughter. (Season 2 only)
 Kerr Smith as Paul Rollins, a partner at Posner/Klein.

Special guest stars
 Sigourney Weaver as therapist and God.
 Katie Holmes as Grace, a woman whom Eli accidentally meets.

On November 6, 2008, TV Guide reported that Jamey Sheridan would guest-star as an evening news anchor. On December 1, 2008, TV Guide reported that Gregory Smith would make a guest appearance in the show's finale.

Episodes

Season 1 (2008)

Season 2 (2008–09)

Reception

Ratings

Critical reception
Season one was met with generally favorable reviews, and currently holds a Metacritic score of 62 out of 100, based on 24 collected reviews. Season two was met with a more enthusiastic response, and holds a Metacritic score of 72 out 100, based on 9 collected reviews.

Controversy
The debut episode attracted controversy due to its plot line, which depicts the hypothesis that autism is caused by a mercury-based preservative formerly used in common childhood vaccines and treats the hypothesis as being credible and legally compelling. This hypothesis is not supported by scientific evidence, but has contributed to decreased vaccination rates. The American Academy of Pediatrics asked ABC to either cancel the episode or include a disclaimer emphasizing that mercury is not used in routine childhood vaccines, and that no scientific link exists between vaccines and autism.  ABC instead decided to present a written notice and voice-over after the episode saying "The preceding story is fictional and does not portray any actual persons, companies, products or events", with a second card directing viewers to the autism web site of the Centers for Disease Control and Prevention.

Awards and nominations

International airings
Eli Stone premiered on ABC on January 31, 2008. It premiered on Fox Life in Greece, and AXN in Japan in 2010. In the UK, the show was first shown on the Sci-Fi Channel in 2008 and was then broadcast on Fiver in June 2010. In Malaysia, the show premiered on TV2 in June 2009, airing all the complete 26 episodes until December 23, 2009. The series was later re-run in 2010.

Home media
On September 2, 2008, Walt Disney Studios Home Entertainment (under the ABC Studios brand name) released the complete first season of Eli Stone on DVD in Region 1. Season 1 was also released in Region 4 on March 18, 2009.  The second and final season was released in Region 1 on August 18, 2009.  By February 2013 the First Season had also been released as Region 2 in a combined Denmark, Sweden, Norway, Finland set.  This set includes the original English dialogue with no captions as the default.

Future
The series lasted two seasons with 26 episodes. If the show had been renewed for a third season, Eli would have a complete wrap-up of the series, including Taylor giving birth to a baby girl and Matt being a surprisingly good father with a better attitude to others, Jordan meeting his ex-wife for the first time since the divorce, and Eli meeting Grace again. Also, the show could have ended in a cliffhanger, with Eli having a high profile as a prophet, and Dr. Chen becoming rich and a star.

References

External links

2008 American television series debuts
2009 American television series endings
2000s American comedy-drama television series
2000s American legal television series
2000s American musical comedy television series
American Broadcasting Company original programming
American fantasy television series
English-language television shows
Serial drama television series
Television series by ABC Studios
Television series created by Greg Berlanti
Television shows set in San Francisco
Television series created by Marc Guggenheim